The First Baptist Church is a Baptist church in Frankfort, Kentucky. The church was founded in 1816, and the current building dated to 1868. The Church is not to be confused with the Church by the same name on Clinton Street, a historically African-American congregation. The Church was affiliated with the Southern Baptist Convention until September 24, 2000 when it removed itself over issues surrounding the Southern Baptist Convention conservative resurgence and the 2000 Baptist Faith and Message.

List of Pastors 
 Henry Toler (1817-1818)
 Jacob Creath (1818-1819)
 Philip Slater Fall (1821-1822)
 Silas Noel (1824-1835)
 George Blackburn (1836)
 James Webb (1836-1837)
 George Sedwick (1837-1838)
 William Hurley (1839)
 James M. Frost, Sr. (1940-1844)
 Abner Goodell (1844-1847)
 Cadwallader Lewis (1847)
 John W. Goodman (1847-1849)
 Alexander A. Macey (1852-1853)
 Andrew Broaddus (1853-1856)
 Y. R. Pitts (1856-1857)
 J. B. Tharp (1857-1860)
 Thomas C. McKee (1861-1862)
 Doctor Newton Porter (1863)
 W. S. Jermane (1864-1867)
 Lyman W. Seely (1868-1872)
 Green Clay Smith (1872-1878)
 James M. Lewis (1878-1884)
 George F. Bagby (1884-1890)
 William Carson Taylor (1890-1897)
 Waldon B. Adams (1898-1910)
 Frederick W. Eberhardt (1910-1914)
 Fred Brown (1915-1916)
 James T. McGlothin (1916-1921)
 Chesterfield Turner (1922-1932)
 Ross E. Dillon (1933-1937)
 Frederick T. Moffatt, Sr. (1937-1961)
 Herman M. Bowers (1961-1976)
 Billy Grey Hurt (1977-1989)
 Mark Hopper (1990-1998)
 David K. Hinson (1998-2010)
 Robert F. Browning (2011-2018)
 Keith Felton (2019–Present)

References

Buildings and structures in Frankfort, Kentucky
Baptist churches in Kentucky
1816 establishments in Kentucky